Esquiva Falcão Florentino (born 12 December 1989) is a Brazilian professional boxer. As an amateur, he won a bronze medal at the 2011 World Championships and silver at the 2012 Olympics.

Early life 
Falcão was born in Vitória, Espírito Santo, and he is the younger brother of professional boxer Yamaguchi Falcão.

Amateur career 
He became famous in his amateur years by winning the Middleweight bronze medal at the 2011 World Amateur Boxing Championships losing his semi to Ryōta Murata. He hereby qualified for the 2012 Olympics, where he won the silver medal, becoming the first Brazilian to reach an Olympic boxing final after defeating Soltan Migitinov, Zoltán Harcsa and local hero Anthony Ogogo.

His name is literally Portuguese for "dodge\slip", as his amateur boxer father wanted to circumvent the prohibition given for coach instructions during the fight, and guide his son simply by shouting his name.

He finished his amateur career with a record of 215 wins and 15 losses.

Professional career
Falcão was supposed to fight Paul Harness in his debut, but Harness got injured only six days before the event and was replaced by Joshua Robertson. In his debut, he knocked out Joshua Robertson on the fourth round. Falcão's next fight was announced as part of the preliminary card of the Manny Pacquiao and Timothy Bradley rematch event against Publio Pena. He dominated most of the fight and won by unanimous decision over Publio Pena. Two judges scored the fight 60-54, and one scored 60-53. Falcão was supposed to face Australian Alex Don, however, Don got injured and was replaced by South Korean Eun-Chang Lee. Falcão defeated Eun-Chang Lee by unanimous decision, the scorecards were 59-55, 59-54 e 58-55, all in favor of Falcão. The fight took place in Macau, China.
 Esquiva was expected to face Mexican Mike Noriega, but Mike broke his hand due to sparring. Noriega was replaced by the American Malcolm Terry Jr. and Falcão beat him via TKO in the second round after a second knockdown, the fight was stopped by the referee. The first knockdown came in the first round.
After some time boxing, Esquiva Falcão amassed an undefeated record of 27 wins with 19 KOs, and then faced Russian Artur Akavov, in a fight where he defeated the Russian in the fourth round via RTD, because his opponent likely had a broken nose due to punches landed by Esquiva.

Falcão is slated to fight Vincenzo Gualtieri for the vacant IBF middleweight world title.  Originally Falcão was supposed to fight Michael Zerafa for the title vacated by Gennady Golovkin, but Zerafa opted to pursue a World Boxing Association title fight against Erislandy Lara that opened the opportunity for Gualtieri.

Professional boxing record

References

External links
Esquiva Falcão on Top Rank

Living people
Middleweight boxers
1989 births
Boxers at the 2012 Summer Olympics
Olympic boxers of Brazil
Olympic silver medalists for Brazil
Olympic medalists in boxing
People from Vitória, Espírito Santo
Medalists at the 2012 Summer Olympics
Brazilian male boxers
AIBA World Boxing Championships medalists
South American Games bronze medalists for Brazil
South American Games medalists in boxing
Competitors at the 2010 South American Games
Sportspeople from Espírito Santo
21st-century Brazilian people